The 3rd constituency of the Saône-et-Loire is a French legislative constituency in the Saône-et-Loire département.

Description

The 3rd constituency of the Saône-et-Loire covers the north of the department around the Roman city of Autun and the industrial town Le Creusot famed for its iron works.

Between 1988 and 2012 control of the seat swapped between Socialist André Billardon and Gaullist Jean-Paul Anciaux.

Historic Representation

Election results

2022

 
 
|-
| colspan="8" bgcolor="#E9E9E9"|
|-

2017

 
 
 
 
 
 
|-
| colspan="8" bgcolor="#E9E9E9"|
|-

2012

 
 
 
 
 
 
|-
| colspan="8" bgcolor="#E9E9E9"|
|-

Sources
Official results of French elections from 2002: "Résultats électoraux officiels en France" (in French).

3